James Polkinghorne (born 21 January 1989) is a former professional Australian rules footballer who played with the Brisbane Lions and Essendon Football Club in the Australian Football League (AFL).

Polkinghorne possesses an exceptional leaping ability thanks to his volleyball background with St. Bernard's College and for the U15 Victorian schoolboys side.

Polkinghorne is a high possession winner and utility player who excels at the stoppages. He represented Vic Metro at the NAB AFL U18 Championships. In 2007 he made his senior debut with Coburg in the Victorian Football League (VFL) as part of a trial program. Runner-up in the Calder Cannons' Best and Fairest award for 2007, he is the son of former Hawthorn player Robert Polkinghorne, nephew of Hawks star David Polkinghorne.

Polkinghorne made his debut in round 6, 2008 at the Gabba against Melbourne.

Polkinghorne received considerable media attention for kicking a match winning torpedo goal from backward of the centre square in the dying minutes of Brisbane's round 10, 2012 victory over ladder leaders West Coast.

He was delisted by the Lions at the end of the 2014 season.

In February 2015, Polkinghorne was given a short-term contract by Essendon to play in the 2015 NAB Challenge as a "top-up" player, due to 26 Essendon players withdrawing from the NAB Challenge because of the ongoing Essendon Football Club supplements controversy. 

In January 2016, he signed with Essendon as a top-up player.

Statistics

|- style="background-color: #EAEAEA"
! scope="row" style="text-align:center" | 2008
|
| 31 || 4 || 0 || 2 || 10 || 12 || 22 || 10 || 10 || 0.0 || 0.5 || 2.5 || 3.0 || 5.5 || 2.5 || 2.5
|-
! scope="row" style="text-align:center" | 2009
|
| 31 || 20 || 15 || 9 || 111 || 105 || 216 || 86 || 48 || 0.8 || 0.5 || 5.6 || 5.3 || 10.8 || 4.3 || 2.4
|- style="background-color: #EAEAEA"
! scope="row" style="text-align:center" | 2010
|
| 31 || 15 || 6 || 4 || 79 || 126 || 205 || 48 || 50 || 0.4 || 0.3 || 5.3 || 8.4 || 13.7 || 3.2 || 3.3
|-
! scope="row" style="text-align:center" | 2011
|
| 31 || 22 || 14 || 17 || 193 || 158 || 351 || 69 || 83 || 0.6 || 0.8 || 8.8 || 7.2 || 16.0 || 3.1 || 3.8
|- style="background-color: #EAEAEA"
! scope="row" style="text-align:center" | 2012
|
| 31 || 20 || 13 || 8 || 173 || 106 || 279 || 66 || 47 || 0.7 || 0.4 || 8.7 || 5.3 || 14.0 || 3.3 || 2.4
|-
! scope="row" style="text-align:center" | 2013
|
| 31 || 11 || 5 || 5 || 88 || 74 || 162 || 38 || 12 || 0.5 || 0.5 || 8.0 || 6.7 || 14.7 || 3.5 || 1.1
|- style="background-color: #EAEAEA"
! scope="row" style="text-align:center" | 2014
|
| 31 || 2 || 0 || 0 || 9 || 9 || 18 || 2 || 5 || 0.0 || 0.0 || 4.5 || 4.5 || 9.0 || 1.0 || 2.5
|-
! scope="row" style="text-align:center" | 2016
|
| 50 || 7 || 1 || 3 || 38 || 67 || 105 || 24 || 7 || 0.1 || 0.4 || 5.4 || 9.6 || 15.0 || 3.4 || 1.0
|- class="sortbottom"
! colspan=3| Career
! 101
! 54
! 48
! 701
! 657
! 1358
! 343
! 262
! 0.5
! 0.5
! 6.9
! 6.5
! 13.4
! 3.4
! 2.6
|}

References

External links

1989 births
Australian rules footballers from Victoria (Australia)
Brisbane Lions players
Living people
Calder Cannons players
Strathmore Football Club players
Essendon Football Club players